Horemheb, also spelled Horemhab or Haremhab (meaning "Horus is in Jubilation") was the last pharaoh of the 18th Dynasty of Egypt (1550–1295 BC). He ruled for at least 14 years between 1319 BC and 1292 BC. He had no relation to the preceding royal family other than by marriage to Mutnedjmet, who is thought (though disputed) to have been the daughter of his predecessor Ay; he is believed to have been of common birth.

Before he became pharaoh, Horemheb was the commander in chief of the army under the reigns of Tutankhamun and Ay. After his accession to the throne, he reformed the Egyptian state and it was under his reign that official action against the preceding Amarna rulers began. Due to this, he is considered the ruler who restabilized his country after the troublesome and divisive Amarna Period.

Horemheb demolished monuments of Akhenaten, reusing the rubble in his own building projects, and usurped monuments of Tutankhamun and Ay. Horemheb presumably had no surviving sons, as he appointed his vizier Paramesse as his successor, who would assume the throne as Ramesses I.

Early career
Horemheb is believed to have originally come from Hnes, on the west bank of the Nile, near the entrance to the Fayum, since his coronation text formally credits the god Horus of Hnes for establishing him on the throne.

His parentage is unknown but he is believed to have been a commoner. According to the French Egyptologist Nicolas Grimal, Horemheb does not appear to be the same person as Paatenemheb (Aten Is Present In Jubilation) who was the commander-in-chief of Akhenaten's army. Grimal notes that Horemheb's political career first began under Tutankhamun where he "is depicted at this king's side in his own tomb chapel at Memphis."

In the earliest known stage of his life, Horemheb served as "the royal spokesman for [Egypt's] foreign affairs" and personally led a diplomatic mission to visit the Nubian governors. This resulted in a reciprocal visit by "the Prince of Miam (Aniba)" to Tutankhamun's court, "an event [that is] depicted in the tomb of the Viceroy Huy." Horemheb quickly rose to prominence under Tutankhamun, becoming commander-in-chief of the army and advisor to the pharaoh. Horemheb's specific titles are spelled out in his Saqqara tomb, which was built while he was still only an official: "Hereditary Prince, Fan-bearer on the Right Side of the King, and Chief Commander of the Army"; the "attendant of the King in his footsteps in the foreign countries of the south and the north"; the "King's Messenger in front of his army to the foreign countries to the south and the north"; and the "Sole Companion, he who is by the feet of his lord on the battlefield on that day of killing Asiatics."

When Tutankhamun died while a teenager, Horemheb had already been officially designated as the rpat or iry-pat (basically the "hereditary or crown prince") and idnw ("deputy of the king" in the entire land) by the child pharaoh; these titles are found inscribed in Horemheb's then private Memphite tomb at Saqqara which dates to the reign of Tutankhamun since the child king's

The title iry-pat (Hereditary Prince) was used very frequently in Horemheb's Saqqara tomb but not combined with any other words. When used alone, the Egyptologist Alan Gardiner has shown that the iry-pat title contains features of ancient descent and lawful inheritance which is identical to the designation for a "Crown Prince." This means that Horemheb was the openly recognised heir to Tutankhamun's throne, and not Ay, Tutankhamun's immediate successor. As the Dutch Egyptologist Jacobus van Dijk observes:

The aged Vizier Ay sidelined Horemheb's claim to the throne and instead succeeded Tutankhamun, probably because Horemheb was in Asia with the army at the time of Tutankhamun's death. No objects belonging to Horemheb were found in Tutankhamun's tomb, but items among the tomb goods donated by other high-ranking officials, such as Maya and Nakhtmin, were identified by Egyptologists. Further, Tutankhamun's queen, Ankhesenamun, refused to marry Horemheb, a commoner, and so make him king of Egypt. Having pushed Horemheb's claims aside, Ay proceeded to nominate the aforementioned Nakhtmin, who was possibly Ay's son or adopted son, to succeed him rather than Horemheb.

After Ay's reign, which lasted for a little over four years, Horemheb managed to seize power, presumably thanks to his position as commander of the army, and to assume what he must have perceived to be his just reward for having ably served Egypt under Tutankhamun and Ay. Horemheb quickly removed Nakhtmin's rival claim to the throne and arranged to have Ay's WV 23 tomb desecrated by smashing the latter's sarcophagus, systematically chiselling Ay's name and figure out of the tomb walls and probably destroying Ay's mummy. However, he spared Tutankhamun's tomb from vandalism presumably because it was Tutankhamun who had promoted his rise to power and chosen him to be his heir. Horemheb also usurped and enlarged Ay's mortuary temple at Medinet Habu for his own use and erased Ay's titulary on the back of a 17 foot colossal statue by carving his own titulary in its place.

Internal reform

Upon his accession, Horemheb initiated a comprehensive series of internal transformations to the power structures of Akhenaten's reign, due to the preceding transfer of state power from Amun's priests to Akhenaten's government officials. Horemheb "appointed judges and regional tribunes ... reintroduced local religious authorities" and divided legal power "between Upper Egypt and Lower Egypt" between "the Viziers of Thebes and Memphis respectively."

These deeds are recorded in a stela which the king erected at the foot of his Tenth Pylon at Karnak. Occasionally called The Great Edict of Horemheb, it is a copy of the actual text of the king's decree to re-establish order to the Two Lands and curb abuses of state authority. The stela's creation and prominent location emphasizes the great importance which Horemheb placed upon domestic reform.

Horemheb also reformed the Army and reorganized the Deir el-Medina workforce in his 7th year while Horemheb's official Maya renewed the tomb of Thutmose IV, which had been disturbed by tomb robbers in his 8th year. While the king restored the priesthood of Amun, he prevented the Amun priests from forming a stranglehold on power, by deliberately reappointing priests who mostly came from the Egyptian army since he could rely on their personal loyalty.
Horemheb was a prolific builder who erected numerous temples and buildings throughout Egypt during his reign. He constructed the Second, Ninth, and Tenth Pylons of the Great Hypostyle Hall, in the Temple at Karnak, using recycled talatat blocks from Akhenaten's own monuments here, as building material for the first two Pylons.

Horemheb continued Tutankhamun's restoration of the old order that had been established before the Amarna period. He reintroduced the ancient cults, particularly Amun, thus proving himself a true pharaoh who established Maat (world order).

Because of his unexpected rise to the throne, Horemheb had two tombs constructed for himself: the first – when he was a mere nobleman – at Saqqara near Memphis, and the other in the Valley of the Kings, in Thebes, in tomb KV 57 as king. His chief wife was Queen Mutnedjmet, who may have been Nefertiti's younger sister. They had no surviving children, although examinations of Mutnedjmet's mummy show that she gave birth several times, and she was buried with an infant, suggesting that she and her last child died in childbirth. Horemheb is not known to have any children by his first wife, Amenia, who died before Horemheb assumed power.

Disputed reign length

Scholars have long disputed whether Horemheb reigned for 14 or 27 years. Manetho's Epitome assigns a reign length of 4 years and 1 month to a king called Harmais. Scholars previously assigned this reign-length to Ay; however, evidence from excavations in Horemheb's tomb (KV57) indicates that this figure should be raised by a decade to [1]4 years and 1 month and attributed to Horemheb. These excavations, conducted under G.T. Martin in 2006 and 2007, uncovered a large hoard of 168 inscribed wine sherds and dockets, below densely compacted debris in a great shaft (called Well Room E) in KV 57. Of the 46 wine sherds with year dates, 14 have nothing but the year date formula, 5 dockets have year 10+X, 3 dockets have year 11+X, 2 dockets preserve year 12+X and 1 docket has a year 13+X inscription. 22 dockets "mention year 13 and 8 have year 14 [of Horemheb]" but none mention a higher date for Horemheb.

The full texts of the docket readings are identical and read as:

Meanwhile, the year 14 dockets, in contrast, are all individual and mention specific wines such as "very good quality wine" or, in one case "sweet wine" and the location of the vineyard is identified. A general example is this text on a year 14 wine docket:

Other year 14 dockets mention Memphis (?), the Western River while their vintners are named as Nakhtamun, [Mer-]seger-men, Ramose, and others.

The "quality and consistency of the KV 57 dockets strongly suggest that Horemheb was buried in his year 14, or at least before the wine harvest of his year 15 at the very latest." This evidence is consistent "with the Horemheb dockets from Deir el-Medina which mention years 2, 3, 4, 6, 13, and 14, but again no higher dates ..." while a docket ascribed to Horemheb from Sedment has year 12." The lack of dated inscriptions for Horemheb after his year 14 also explains the unfinished state of Horemheb's royal KV 57 tomb – "a fact not taken into account by any of those [scholars] defending a long reign [of 26 or 27 years]. The tomb is comparable to that of Seti I in size and decoration technique, and Seti I's tomb is far more extensively decorated than that of Horemheb, and yet Seti managed to virtually complete his tomb within a decade, whereas Horemheb did not even succeed in fully decorating the three rooms he planned to have done, leaving even the burial hall unfinished. Even if we assume that Horemheb did not begin the work on his royal tomb until his year 7 or 8, ... it remains a mystery how the work could not have been completed had he lived on for another 20 or more years." Therefore, most scholars now accept a reign of 14 years and 1 month.

The argument for a 27 year reign derived from two texts. The first is an anonymous hieratic graffito written on the shoulder of a now fragmented statue from his mortuary temple in Karnak which mentions the appearance of the king himself, or a royal cult statue representing the king, for a religious feast. The ink graffito reads Year 27, first Month of Shemu day 9, the day on which Horemheb, who loves Amun and hates his enemies, entered [the temple for the event]. It was disputed whether this was a contemporary text or a reference to a festival commemorating Horemheb's accession written in the reign of a later king. The second text is the Inscription of Mes, from the reign of Ramesses II, which records that a court case decision was rendered in favour of a rival branch of Mes' family in year 59 of Horemheb. It was argued that the year 59 Horemheb date included the reigns of all the rulers between Amenhotep III and Horemheb. Subtracting the nearly 17 year reign of Akhenaten, the 2 year reign of Neferneferuaten, the 9 year reign of Tutankhamun and the reign of Ay suggested a reign of 26–27 years for Horemheb. However, the length of Ay's reign is not actually known and Wolfgang Helck argues that there was no standard Egyptian practice of including the years of all the rulers between Amenhotep III and Horemheb.

Cartouches and symbols 
Horemheb turned to several gods because of his various names: his throne name means 'Sacred are the manifestations of Ra' and his name birth name is accompanied by the epithet 'beloved of Amun'.

It is not yet proven whether Horemheb had really exorcised the Amarna period; the great iconoclasm began only after his death. To be able to build for himself, however, he did have the Per-Aten temple at Karnak pulled down and constructed a pylon of the Amun temple with its stone blocks. The Aten reliefs from the Amarna period on those blocks therefore remained fairly well preserved.

Horemheb appear in reliefs wearing the typical pleated linen robe of a high ranking official depicted sitting in front of an offering table, as a pharaoh holding the pole and the sekhem sceptre of a high official (the uraeus was added after his ascension to the throne), with a benu-bird regarded as the protector of the dead as the soul of Ra sitting on a stand, and finally a man worshipping a benu-bird.

The coronation inscription on the back of a double statue, showing Horemheb with his wife, tells that he is under the protection of Horus and appointed by Amun. It reports further that he had the damaged statues of the old gods remade and had the temples that had fallen into disrepair rebuilt. For the Amun cult, 'he provided them with servants to the god and lector priests from the military elite'. In a decree on a stele in Karnak, he again officially confirms the restoration of the old order.

Succession

Under Horemheb, Egypt's power and confidence were once again restored after the internal chaos of the Amarna period; this situation set the stage for the rise of the 19th Dynasty under such ambitious Pharaohs as Seti I and Ramesses II. Geoffrey Thorndike Martin in his excavation work at Saqqara states that the burial of Horemheb's second wife Mutnedjmet, as well as that of an unborn or newborn baby, was located at the bottom of a shaft to the rooms of Horemheb's Saqqara tomb. He notes that "a fragment of an alabaster vase inscribed with a funerary text for the chantress of Amun and King's Wife, Mutnodjmet, as well as pieces of a statuette of her [was found here] ... The funerary vase in particular, since it bears her name and titles would hardly have been used for the burial of some other person."Eugene Strouhal studied a skull and other bones and concluded that they belonged to the queen. According to his analysis, the queen lost her teeth at an early age. She died at around age forty, possibly in childbirth, as the remains of a fetus were found with her body.Since Horemheb had no surviving son, he appointed his Vizier, Paramesse, to succeed him upon his death, both to reward Paramesse's loyalty and because the latter had both a son and grandson to secure Egypt's royal succession. Paramesse employed the name Ramesses I upon assuming power and founded the 19th Dynasty of the New Kingdom. While the decoration of Horemheb's KV 57 tomb was still unfinished upon his death, this situation is not unprecedented: Amenhotep II's tomb was also not fully completed when he was buried, even though this ruler enjoyed a reign of 26 years.

Tomb and excavation
Directly after his accession to the throne, Horemheb had a tomb built in the Valley of Kings, abandoning his earlier one near Memphis. For the first time, scenes from the Book of Gates were used in the burial chamber as a decoration for a royal tomb.

Horemheb's tomb was excavated in the early 20th century by Theodore M. Davis. Davis discovered it in a poor state due to robbers and earth movements over the centuries. The lid of the sarcophagus had been taken off and smashed by robbers.

Cultural depictions

Film
 Horemheb was portrayed by Victor Mature in The Egyptian (1954), the film adaptation of Mika Waltari's bestselling novel.
Horemheb was portrayed by Salah Zulfikar in Nefertiti and Akhenaton (1973), Mexican short film of Raúl Araiza.

Television
 Horemheb was portrayed by British actor Nonso Anozie in the 2015 mini-TV series Tut which aired on Spike in the US, and on Channel 5 in the UK.

Music
 Horemhab is a character in the opera Akhnaten by Philip Glass; he is sung by a baritone.

Literature
 Horemheb is a major character in Nick Drake's trilogy of mystery novels, The Book of the Dead, Tutankhamun and The Book of Chaos.
 Horemheb is a major character in P. C. Doherty's trilogy of historical novels, An Evil Spirit Out of the West, The Season of the Hyaena and The Year of the Cobra.
 Horemheb is a major character in Pauline Gedge's historical novel The Twelfth Transforming.
 Horemheb is a major character in Katie Hamstead's trilogy, Kiya: Hope of the Pharaoh, Kiya: Mother of the King and Kiya: Rise of a New Dynasty.
 Horemheb is a key character in Kyah Merritt's historical trilogy A Legacy of Light (trilogy).
 Horemheb is a minor character in the novels Nefertiti and  The Heretic Queen by Michelle Moran.
 Horemheb appears as a major character in Lynda Suzanne Robinson's Lord Meren series of Egyptian mysteries.
 Horemheb is a minor character in Chie Shinohara's Japanese graphic novel, Red River, centered around ancient Anatolia and ancient Egypt.
 Horemheb is a major character in Mika Waltari's 1945 historical fiction international bestseller The Egyptian
 Horemheb is a major character, originally named Kaires, in two novels by Allen Drury.
 Horemheb is a key character in Judith Tarr's historical novel Pillar of Fire.

Footnotes

References

Bibliography

 Cyril Aldred, Two monuments of the reign of Ḥoremḥab, in: Journal of Egyptian Archaeology 54 (1968), 100–106.
 Jürgen von Beckerath, Nochmals die Regierungsdauer des Ḥaremḥab, in: SAK 6 (1978), 43–49.
 Jürgen von Beckerath, Chronologie des pharaonischen Ägypten, MÄS 46, Philip Von Zabern, Mainz: 1997.
 Alan Gardiner, The Inscription of Mes: A Contribution to Egyptian Juridical Procedure, Untersuchungen IV, Pt. 3 (Leipzig: 1905).
 Nicholas Grimal, A History of Ancient Egypt, Blackwell Books: 1992.
 K.A. Kitchen, The Basis of Egyptian Chronology in relation to the Bronze Age," Volume 1: pp. 37–55 in "High, Middle or Low?: Acts of an International Colloquium on absolute chronology held at the University of Gothenburg 20–22 August 1987." (ed: Paul Aström).

External links

 
 
 
 

 
14th-century BC births
1292 BC deaths
14th-century BC Pharaohs
13th-century BC Pharaohs
Pharaohs of the Eighteenth Dynasty of Egypt
Year of birth unknown
Tutankhamun
Ay
Fan-bearer on the Right Side of the King
Regents of Egypt